Neptune has been directly explored by one space probe, Voyager 2, in 1989. , there are no confirmed future missions to visit the Neptunian system, although a tentative Chinese mission has been planned for launch in 2024. NASA, ESA, and independent academic groups have proposed future scientific missions to visit Neptune. Some mission plans are still active, while others have been abandoned or put on hold.

Since the mid-1990s, Neptune has been studied from afar with telescopes, including the Hubble Space Telescope and the ground-based Keck telescope using adaptive optics.

Voyager 2 

After Voyager 2 visited Saturn successfully, it was decided to fund further missions to Uranus and Neptune. These missions were conducted by the Jet Propulsion Laboratory, and the Neptunian mission was dubbed "Voyager Neptune Interstellar Mission". Voyager 2 started taking navigation images of Neptune in May 1988. Voyager 2 observation phase proper of Neptune began 5 June 1989, the spacecraft officially reached the Neptunian system on 25 August, and data collection ceased on 2 October. The need to avoid ring material detected by stellar occultations prompted this trajectory to be abandoned, and a trajectory that largely avoided the rings but resulted in more distant flybys of both targets was plotted.

At that time, Neptune was the farthest known body in the Solar System. It would not be until 1999 that Pluto would move further from the Sun in its trajectory. Voyager 2 studied Neptune's atmosphere, Neptune's rings, its magnetosphere, and Neptune's moons. The Neptunian system had been studied scientifically for many years with telescopes and indirect methods, but the close inspection by the Voyager 2 probe settled many issues and revealed a plethora of information that could not have been obtained otherwise. The data from Voyager 2 are still the best data available on this planet in most cases.

The exploration mission revealed that Neptune's atmosphere is very dynamic, even though it receives only three percent of the sunlight that Jupiter receives. Winds on Neptune were found to be the strongest in the Solar System, up to three times stronger than Jupiter's and nine times stronger than the strongest winds on Earth. Most winds blew westward, opposite the planet's rotation. Separate cloud decks were discovered, with cloud systems emerging and dissolving within hours and giant storms circling the entire planet within sixteen to eighteen hours in the upper layers. Voyager 2 discovered an anticyclone dubbed the Great Dark Spot, similar to Jupiter's Great Red Spot. However, images taken by the Hubble Space Telescope in 1994 revealed that the Great Dark Spot had disappeared. Also seen in Neptune's upper atmosphere was an almond-shaped spot designated D2 and a bright, quickly moving cloud high above the cloud decks dubbed "Scooter".

The fly-by of the Neptunian system provided the first accurate measurement of Neptune's mass, which was found to be 0.5 percent less than previously calculated. The new figure disproved the hypothesis that an undiscovered Planet X acted upon the orbits of Neptune and Uranus.

Neptune's magnetic field was found to be highly tilted and largely offset from the planet's centre. The probe discovered auroras much weaker than those on Earth or other planets. The radio instruments on board found that Neptune's day lasts 16 hours and 6.7 minutes. Neptune's rings had been observed from Earth many years prior to Voyager 2 visit, but the close inspection revealed that the ring systems were full circle and intact, and a total of four rings were counted.

Voyager 2 discovered six new small moons orbiting Neptune's equatorial plane, dubbed Naiad, Thalassa, Despina, Galatea, Larissa and Proteus. Three of Neptune's moons—Proteus, Nereid, and Triton—were photographed in detail, of which only the last two had been known prior to the visit. Proteus proved to be an ellipsoid, as large as gravity allows an ellipsoid body to become without rounding into a sphere, and appeared almost as dark as soot in color. Triton was revealed as having a remarkably active past, with active geysers, polar caps, and a very thin atmosphere characterized by clouds of what is thought to be nitrogen ice particles. At just , it is the coldest known planetary body in the Solar System.

A list of previous and upcoming missions to the outer Solar System can be found at the List of missions to the outer planets article.

Possible future missions 
 there are no approved future missions to visit the Neptunian system. NASA, ESA and independent academic groups have proposed and worked on future scientific missions to visit Neptune. Some mission plans are still active, while others have been abandoned or put on hold.

After the Voyager flyby, NASA's next step in scientific exploration of the Neptune system was considered to be a flagship orbiter mission. Such a hypothetical mission is envisioned to be possible in the late 2020s or early 2030s. Another one proposed for the 2040s is called the Neptune-Triton Explorer (NTE). NASA has researched several other project options for both flyby and orbiter missions (of similar design as the Cassini–Huygens mission to Saturn). These missions are often collectively called "RMA Neptune-Triton-KBO" missions, which also includes orbital missions that would not visit Kuiper belt objects (KBOs). Because of budgetary constraints, technological considerations, scientific priorities and other factors, none of these have been approved.

Specific exploration mission proposals to Neptune under development include:
 Interstellar Express — A pair of probes by CNSA designed to explore the heliosphere. The second would fly by Neptune in 2038 at a distance of 1,000 km and drop an atmospheric probe en route to the tail of the heliosphere.
 ODINUS —  A mission concept based on a twin spacecraft mission to investigate the Neptunian and Uranian systems. Launch date would be 2034.
 OSS mission — A proposed collaborative flyby mission by ESA and NASA. Its main focus would be to map the gravitational fields in deep space, including the Outer Solar System (up to 50 AU).
Triton Hopper — A NIAC study of a mission to Neptune with the goal of landing, and flying from site to site, on Neptune's moon Triton.
Trident — A finalist in the Discovery program, would perform a single flyby of Neptune in 2038 and closely study its largest moon Triton.
 Neptune Odyssey — the current mission concept for a Neptune orbiter and atmospheric probe being studied as a possible large strategic science mission by NASA that would launch in 2033 and arrive at Neptune in 2049.

Cancelled or unselected mission concepts include:
 Argo — A cancelled mission concept in the New Frontiers program, a flyby mission to visit Jupiter, Saturn, Neptune (with Triton) and the Kuiper belt with launch in 2019.
 New Horizons 2 — A cancelled mission concept for a flyby mission to the Neptune system and Kuiper belt based on the New Horizons space probe.

The lowest-energy trajectory for a launch from Earth to Neptune uses a Jupiter gravity assist, opening an optimal launch window with a 12-year interval, when Jupiter is in a favourable position relative to the Earth and Neptune. An optimal launch window was open for such a Neptune mission from 2014 to 2019, with the next opportunity occurring from 2031. These constraints are based on the requirement of a gravity assist from Jupiter. With the new Space Launch System (SLS) technology in development at Boeing, deep space missions with heavier payloads could potentially be propelled at much greater speeds (200 AU in 15 years) and missions to the outer planets could be launched independently of gravity assistance.

Scientific studies from afar 
Space telescopes such as the Hubble Space Telescope have signified a new era of detailed observations of faint objects from afar, across the entire electromagnetic spectrum. This includes faint objects in the Solar system, such as Neptune. Since 1997, adaptive optics technology has also allowed for detailed scientific observations of Neptune and its atmosphere from ground-based telescopes. These image recordings now exceed the capability of HST by far and in some instances even the Voyager images, such as those of Uranus. Ground-based observations are however always limited in their registration of electromagnetic waves of certain wavelengths, due to the inevitable atmospheric absorption, in particular of high energy waves.

References

Sources 
 Neptune Voyager 2 – The Interstellar Mission, Jet Propulsion Laboratory, California Institute of Technology
 Neptune: In Depth Planets, NASA

External links
 25 Years After Neptune: Reflections on Voyager NASA Voyager website
 Images of Neptune and All Available Satellites Photojournal, JPL

Neptune
Spaceflight
Discovery and exploration of the Solar System